Cape Town City Football Club was an association football club based in Cape Town, South Africa. The club competed in the National Football League (NFL) from 1962 until the league was dissolved in 1977. Cape Town City won the NFL title in 1973 and 1976, as well as the NFL Cup in 1970, 1971 and 1976. Home matches were played at Hartleyvale Stadium in Observatory.

Honours
 NFL Champions: 1973, 1976 (Runners-up 1965, 1970, 1971, 1974)
 Castle Cup (NFL Cup) Winners: 1970, 1971, 1976 (Runners-up 1969)
 UTC Bowl Winners: 1971, 1973 (Runners-up 1965)
 Champion of Champions Winners: 1971, 1972, 1974
 Coca-Cola Shield: (Runners-up 1970, 1975)

External links
Cape Town City 1964 Team Photo
Photo of Home Ground – Hartleyvale, Observatory
The 1976 Castle Cup Final Match Programme: Cape Town City v Hellenic

Gallery

Association football clubs established in 1960
National Football League (South Africa) clubs
Defunct soccer clubs in South Africa
Soccer clubs in Cape Town
Soccer and apartheid